The Nanjing Broadcast Television Tower in Jiangsu Province is a free-standing telecommunications and observation tower whose antenna reaches up to 318.5 metres (1045 feet). It was built in 1996 in Nanjing, China.

See also
 List of towers

Notes

External links
 http://www.skyscraperpage.com/diagrams/?b7780

Towers completed in 1996
Observation towers in China
Communication towers in China
Buildings and structures in Nanjing
1996 establishments in China